"This Isn't Love" is a song by Australian rock band Boom Crash Opera. The song was released in August 1993 as the third and final single from their third studio album, Fabulous Beast. The song charted at number 78 on the Australian ARIA Singles Chart.

Track listing
 "This Isn't Love" – 3:32
 "Holy Water" – 3:55
 "Bettadaze" (acoustic) – 3:18
 "Don't Let On" – 4:04
 "Mindless" – 4:30

Charts

References

External links
 

1993 singles
1993 songs
Boom Crash Opera songs
East West Records singles
Songs written by Richard Pleasance